Anatie "Natty" Dominique (August 2, 1896 – August 30, 1982) was an American jazz trumpeter, who was born in New Orleans, Louisiana, United States, and most notable for his long body of work with Johnny Dodds.

References

1896 births
1982 deaths
American jazz trumpeters
American male trumpeters
Jazz musicians from New Orleans
20th-century American musicians
20th-century trumpeters
20th-century American male musicians
American male jazz musicians